Bill Frank Whitten (October 4, 1944 – April 8, 2006) was a Hollywood fashion designer who designed stage clothing and high-end fashion for musicians and celebrities.

In 1974, Whitten's custom shirt business in West Hollywood, Workroom 27, was discovered by Neil Diamond who became an advocate for Whitten's custom-designed clothing. At the height of his business, Whitten had a factory with 50 employees making stage clothing for 20 groups including the Commodores, The Jacksons, and Edgar Winter. He also designed Michael Jackson's famous rhinestone glove and crystal-encrusted socks. In 1990, he opened a store, Bill Whitten, on Melrose Avenue.

Whitten died of cancer on April 8, 2006, and is buried in Los Angeles, California. He is the brother of artist Jack Whitten.

References

1944 births
2006 deaths
American fashion designers